Northland College may refer to:

 Northland College, Kaikohe, New Zealand
 Northland College (Wisconsin) in Ashland, Wisconsin, U.S.
 Northland Scholars Academy, formerly Northland International University, Northland Baptist Bible College and other names, in Dunbar, Wisconsin, U.S.

See also
 Northlands College, in Saskatchewan, Canada